This article augments the List of parliaments of England to be found elsewhere (see link below) and to precede Duration of English, British and United Kingdom parliaments from 1660, with additional information which could not be conveniently incorporated in them.

The definition of which bodies should be classified as parliaments becomes increasingly problematic before the accession of the Tudor monarchs, starting with King Henry VII. Different sources may vary in the number of Parliaments in a particular reign.

The "No." columns in the tables below contain the number counting forward from the accession of particular monarchs of England before 1660 (or the Commonwealth and Protectorate regimes of the 1650s). The "-Plt" columns count backwards from the parliament elected in 2005. This is not the conventional way of numbering parliaments. 

The "Duration" column is calculated from the date of the first meeting of the parliament to that of dissolution, using a year-month-day format.

Origin of parliament
Parliament grew out of the Curia Regis, which was a body which advised the king on legislative matters. It had come into existence after the Norman Conquest of England in 1066. It replaced the earlier Anglo-Saxon institution of the Witenagemot, which had a similar mix of important clerical and lay members, but different powers.

The Curia Regis (known in English as the council or court) was composed of prominent church leaders (archbishops, bishops and some abbots) and the king's feudal tenants-in-chief (in effect the landowning aristocracy, the earls and barons).

The point at which some meetings of the prelates and lay magnates became known as parliaments is difficult to define precisely.

The term parliamentum was used in the general sense of a meeting at which negotiations took place. The word began to be used to refer to meetings of the council in the 1230s and 1240s. The earliest known official use was by the Court of King's Bench which in November 1236 adjourned a case to be heard at a parliamentum at Westminster due on the following 13 January.

A meeting of the council was held at Merton Abbey in 1236. This gathering became known as the Parliament of Merton. It passed certain legislation, which constitutes the first entry in the official collection of the statutes of England, published in the nineteenth century.

It may be that the meeting at Merton involved no innovation, but owes its prominence to the chance survival of some records which were copied into a collection of statutes from the second half of the fourteenth century.

The list of parliaments in this article commences with a meeting in London in 1242, which was summoned in 1241. This again may not have represented any real innovation, but rather is given prominence by the chance survival of records. Powell and Wallis confirm that a copy of the writ of summons has survived, possibly the earliest still in existence. Dramatic political events at the meeting were recorded by the chronicler Matthew Paris, so it is known that the king asked for a tax, which the council (retrospectively dubbed a parliament) refused to grant. It is unlikely that the gathering was seen by contemporaries as any different from the similar meetings of the Curia Regis that had been held since the Conquest, but as a list of parliaments must start at some time this was the meeting chosen by the source from which this list is drawn.

List of parliaments from 1241
The English civil year started on 25 March until 1752. The years used in this article have been converted to the new style where necessary. Old style dates are a year earlier than the new style for dates between 1 January and 24 March. No attempt has been made to compensate for the eleven days which did not occur in September 1752, both in England and Scotland, as well as in other British controlled territories, when the day which followed 2 September was 14 September. This was done to bring Britain and its empire fully into line with the Gregorian calendar.

There were some meetings before 1241 which are sometimes called parliaments, notably the Parliament of Merton in 1236.

Early parliaments did not, so far as is known, include representatives of the communities (or commons) of England. They were composed of important church officials and landowners, whom the king summoned individually to advise him, similar to the group of men which eventually became known as the House of Lords.
 
The sheriffs of the English counties were ordered to send knights of the shire to attend a number of parliaments before 1265, but they were not required to have them chosen by election. No such summonses are known to have required the attendance of citizens of cities or burgesses of other boroughs. Records of this sort of summons survive for the Oxford Parliament, which was the seventh parliament of King Henry III, assembled 27 October 1258 and presumed dissolved when writs de expensis were issued on 4 November 1258, and for the same king's sixteenth parliament, summoned on 4 June 1264 and assembled on 22 June 1264, although the date of dissolution is unknown.

Montfort's Parliament of 1265 was the first parliament of England to include representatives chosen by the counties (or shires), the cities, and the boroughs, groups who eventually became the House of Commons, although to begin with Lords and Commons met all together,

In 1320 it became the invariable practice to summon the Commons to Parliament. If the Commons were not summoned to an early parliament, this is indicated in a footnote. The normal place for parliaments to meet was in Westminster. If a different location is known, it is indicated in a note. Unusual features of the dates of summons, attendance or dissolution of a parliament are included in a note.

Parliaments of King Henry III
King Henry III reigned between 18/19 October 1216 and 16 November 1272.

Notes:-
1 The presiding officer of the House of Commons was initially known as the "Prolocutor" and sometimes as the Parlour, but the term most often used was "Speaker" and this became the title always used from the 1540s onwards.
2 No commoners were summoned.
(a) 7th: This Parliament was at Oxford. It is sometimes known as the Mad Parliament. Knights of the shire (representing counties) were the only commoners summoned. They were not required to be chosen by election. The date writs de expenses were issued is assumed to be the date of dissolution.
(b) The exact date when the Parliament assembled is unknown.
(c) The exact date when the Parliament was dissolved is unknown.
(d) 16th: Knights of the shire were the only commoners summoned. They were not required to be chosen by election.
(e) 17th: It is sometimes known as Montfort's Parliament. This is the first Parliament to which representatives of cities and boroughs were summoned, as well as knights of the shire. It is also the first Parliament to which the representatives were required to be chosen by election. The date writs de expenses were issued is assumed to be the date of dissolution.

Parliaments of King Edward I
King Edward I reigned between 20 November 1272 – 7 July 1307.

Notes:-
1 The presiding officer of the House of Commons was initially known as the "Prolocutor" and sometimes as the Parlour, but the term most often used was "Speaker" and this became the title always used from the 1540s onwards.
2 No commoners were summoned.
(a) 1st: For the first time since 1264-65 the representatives of the communities of the Realm are known to have been summoned to Parliament.
(b) 2nd: The knights of the shires only were summoned to this Parliament. Date of grant of supply is deemed to be the date of dissolution.
(c) The exact date when the Parliament assembled is unknown.
(d) 19th: Knights only summoned 13–14 June 1290. Assembled 23 April 1290 Lords and 15 July 1290 Commons. After this Parliament it became fairly usual for the representatives of the counties, cities and boroughs to be summoned to attend Parliament and from 1320 they were always included.
(e) This Parliament included Scottish members.
(f) 29th: Model Parliament summoned 30 September, 1 and 3 October 1295. This is the traditional start of the regular participation of the Commons in Parliament. Date of grant of supply is deemed to be the date of dissolution.
(g) Date of grant of supply is deemed to be the date of dissolution.
(h) 33rd: Summoned 30 September 1297 (peers) and 6 October 1297 (knights of the shire). Assembled 9 October 1297 Lords and 15 October 1297 Commons. Met in London. Date of grant of supply is deemed to be the date of dissolution.
(i) 34th: Met in York.
(j) 35th: Summoned 10, 11 and 13 April 1298.
(k) Date of issue of Writs de expensis is deemed to be the date of dissolution.
(l) 40th: Met in Lincoln. Dissolved 27–30 January 1301 (when writs de expensis were issued).
(m) 42nd: Summoned 14, 20 and 24 July 1303. Met in London. Date of issue of Writs de expensis deemed to be the date of dissolution.
(n) 45th: Assembled and dissolved 30 May 1306. Date of issue of Writs de expensis is deemed to be the date of dissolution.
(o) 46th: Met in Carlisle. Deemed dissolved when writs de expensis were issued 20 January 1307 (burgesses only) and 19 March 1307 (knights only).

Parliaments of King Edward II
King Edward II reigned between 7 July 1307 – 20 January 1327.

Notes:-
1 The presiding officer of the House of Commons was initially known as the "Prolocutor" and sometimes as the Parlour, but the term most often used was "Speaker" and this became the title always used from the 1540s onwards.
2 No commoners were summoned.
(a) The date writs de expenses were issued is assumed to be the date of dissolution.
(b) 8th: Met in London. The date writs de expenses were issued is assumed to be the date of dissolution.
(c) 15th: Met in Lincoln. The date writs de expenses were issued is assumed to be the date of dissolution.
(d) 15th: Met in York. The date writs de expenses were issued is assumed to be the date of dissolution.
(e) 24th: Only MPs for the Cinque Ports were summoned. Met in London. The date writs de expenses were issued is assumed to be the date of dissolution.
(f) 26th: This Parliament continued after the deposition of the King into the next reign. See 1st Parliament of King Edward III of England for further details and duration.

Parliaments of King Edward III
King Edward III reigned between 25 January 1327 – 21 June 1377.

Notes:-
1 The presiding officer of the House of Commons was initially known as the "Prolocutor" and sometimes as the Parlour, but the term most often used was "Speaker" and this became the title always used from the 1540s onwards.
2 Hungerford was the first presiding officer of the Commons to be recorded as having the title of Speaker.
(a) 1st: Continued from the last reign. Date of issue of writs de expensis deemed to be date of dissolution.
(b) Date of issue of writs de expensis deemed to be date of dissolution.
(c) Met at Lincoln. Date of issue of writs de expensis deemed to be date of dissolution. 
(d) Met at York. Date of issue of writs de expensis deemed to be date of dissolution. 
(e) 5th: May have met at New Sarum (now more commonly called Salisbury), York or Northampton, as it is uncertain which meeting was of this Parliament and which were gatherings of lesser status. Date of issue of writs de expensis deemed to be date of dissolution. 
(f) Met at New Sarum (now more commonly called Salisbury). Date of issue of writs de expensis deemed to be date of dissolution.
(g) Met at Winchester. Date of issue of writs de expensis deemed to be date of dissolution.
(h) Met at Northampton. Date of issue of writs de expensis deemed to be date of dissolution.
(i) Met at Northampton.
(j) 46th: Known as the Good Parliament.
(k) 47th: Known as the Bad Parliament. Date of issue of writs de expensis deemed to be date of dissolution.

Parliaments of King Richard II

Note:-
(a) 14th: Known as the Wonderful Parliament.
(b) 15th: Known as the Merciless Parliament.

Parliaments of King Henry IV

Note:-
(a) 1st: Known as a Convention Parliament.

Parliaments of King Henry V

Note:-
(a) Known as the Fire and Faggot Parliament.
(b) Known as the Parliament of 1415.

Parliaments of King Henry VI

Note:-
(a) 4th: Known as the Parliament of Bats.
(b) 21st: Known as the Parliament of Devils.
(c) 23rd: This Parliament was held during a period when King Henry VI was restored to the throne. It ended when King Edward IV deposed Henry for the second time.

Parliaments of King Edward IV

Parliament of King Richard III

Parliaments of King Henry VII

Parliaments of King Henry VIII

Note:-
(a) 5th: Known as the Reformation Parliament.

Parliaments of King Edward VI

Parliaments of Queen Mary I

Parliaments of Queen Elizabeth I

Parliaments of King James I

Parliaments of King Charles I
The Long Parliament, which commenced in this reign, had the longest term and the most complex history of any English Parliament. The entry in the first table below relates to the whole Parliament. Although it rebelled against King Charles I and continued to exist long after the King's death, it was a Parliament he originally summoned. An attempt has been made to set out the different phases of the Parliament in the second table in this section and in subsequent sections. The phases are indicated by a letter in the -Plt column (in the case of these phases they all share the same -Plt number, which is used in the first table of this section, so the column is available to set out the letter for the phases moving forward from 1640) and are explained in a note.

Note:-
(a) Speakers of the Long Parliament (including times when it sat as the Rump Parliament): Lenthall 3 November 1640 – 26 July 1647; Pelham 30 July 1647 – 5 August 1647; Lenthall 6 August 1647 – 20 April 1653 (restored to the chair by the Army and sat until Oliver Cromwell dissolved the Rump Parliament) and 26 December 1653 – 13 January 1660 (when the Rump was restored); Say 13 January 1660 – 21 January 1660 and Lenthall 21 January 1660 – 16 March 1660.

The Long Parliament (Royalist phases)

Note:-
(a) Phase 'a' of the Long Parliament was when it functioned as a conventional Parliament, requiring the assent of King Charles I to legislation. An unusual feature was that a law was enacted providing that this Parliament could not be lawfully dissolved without its own consent. This phase ended when the King raised his standard (22 August 1642) and commenced the English Civil War. The day before this event is the date inserted in the Dissolved column.
(b) Phase 'c' of the Long Parliament was the King's Oxford Parliament. The King was unable to lawfully dissolve the Long Parliament, without its consent, so he summoned the members to meet at Oxford. Royalists and those interested in trying to settle the Civil War by compromise attended the meetings, which were in opposition to the revolutionary body (phase 'b' of the Long Parliament, see below) sitting concurrently at Westminster. The date of the first meeting is given in the Assembled column and of the last sitting in the Dissolved column.

Parliaments of the Revolution and Commonwealth

Note:-
(a) This was phase 'b' of the Long Parliament, when it functioned as a revolutionary Parliament, after the start of the English Civil War. Parliament assumed the power to legislate by Ordinance, without needing Royal assent. This phase ended with Pride's Purge, which converted the Long Parliament into the Rump Parliament. In 1644 the King summoned the Long Parliament to meet at Oxford. Those members who responded constituted the King's Oxford Parliament (phase c of the Parliament, see the previous section), in opposition to the revolutionary Parliament which continued to sit at the Palace of Westminster. The date in the Assembled column is the day when King Charles I raised his standard and commenced the English Civil War. The date in the Dissolved column is the day before Pride's Purge, when the full Long Parliament last met (until the Purge was reversed on 21 February 1660).
(b) This was phase 'd' of the Long Parliament, known as the Rump Parliament. During this period the Army only permitted selected members to continue to participate. The House of Lords was abolished (6 February 1649) as was the monarchy (7 February 1649). Thereafter the Rump of the House of Commons was the only remaining element of Parliament. It legislated the Commonwealth of England into existence on 19 May 1649. The date of Pride's Purge is given in the Assembled column and the date when Oliver Cromwell dissolved the Rump by force is in the Dissolved column.
(c) The Little or Barebones Parliament was an appointed body.

Parliaments of the Protectorate

These parliaments included representatives of Scotland and Ireland.

Note:-
(a) This was phase 'e' of the Long Parliament. The Army restored the Rump Parliament, to liquidate the Protectorate and re-establish the Commonwealth regime.

Parliaments of the Commonwealth

Note:-
(a) This was phase 'f' of the Long Parliament, with the Rump Parliament running the restored Commonwealth regime.
(b) This was phase 'g' of the Long Parliament. Pride's Purge was reversed and the full Long Parliament made arrangements for a Convention Parliament and then dissolved itself.
(c) This was a Convention Parliament which restored the monarchy by recognising King Charles II as the rightful King.

List of Parliaments: 1660 back to 1364
Preliminary note: The English civil year started on 25 March until 1752 (Scotland having changed to 1 January in 1600). The years used in this article have been converted to the new style where necessary. Old style dates would be a year earlier than the new style for days between 1 January and 24 March. No attempt has been made to compensate for the eleven days which did not occur in September 1752 in both England and Scotland, when the day after 2 September was 14 September), so as to bring the dating in Great Britain and its associated territories fully into line with the Gregorian calendar.

Parliaments 1504-1660

Notes: -
(a) CP - Parliament summoned by the Commonwealth or Protectorate regimes.
(b) This was the Convention Parliament, which restored the monarchy by recognising King Charles II of England as the lawful sovereign.
(c) This was the last phase of the Long Parliament, between the reversal of Pride's Purge and the final dissolution of the Parliament.
(d) This was a phase of the Long Parliament, between the restoration of the Rump and the reversal of Pride's Purge. On 13 October 1659 it ceased to be a Protectorate legislature. From 26 December 1659 it functioned as a Commonwealth legislature.
(e) This was the Third Protectorate Parliament.
(f) This was the Second Protectorate Parliament.
(g) This was the First Protectorate Parliament.
(h) This was the Little or Barebones Parliament, an appointed assembly not an elected Parliament.
(i) KC1 - Parliament summoned by King Charles I of England. 
(j) This was the King's Oxford Parliament, held at Oxford in opposition to the Long Parliament sitting at Westminster. It consisted of Royalist members of the Long Parliament.
(k) This was the first phase of the Long Parliament. Under legislation enacted before the English Civil War this Parliament could not lawfully be dissolved without its consent. This phase of the Parliament was ended when Oliver Cromwell and his troops prevented the Parliament from continuing to sit. All phases of the Long Parliament and the King's Oxford Parliament, being sittings of all or part of the same body are given the same number in the No column.
(l) KJ1 - Parliament summoned by King James I of England.
(m) QE1 - Parliament summoned by Queen Elizabeth I of England.
(n) QM1 - Parliament summoned by Queen Mary I of England.
(o) KE6 - Parliament summoned by King Edward VI of England.
(p) KH8 - Parliament summoned by King Henry VIII of England.
(q) KH7 - Parliament summoned by King Henry VII of England.

Parliaments 1400-1497

Notes:-
(a) KR3 - Parliament summoned by King Richard III of England.
(b) KE4 - Parliament summoned by King Edward IV of England.
(c) King Edward IV restored to the throne since the previous Parliament.
(d) KH6 - Parliament summoned by King Henry VI of England. KH6/23: King Henry VI restored to the throne since the previous Parliament. Parliament dissolved by the deposition of the monarch.
(e) Parliament dissolved by the deposition of the monarch.
(f) Date given for dismissal is the date when supply was granted.
(g) The actual date of dismissal was post circa the date given, so the duration is a minimum estimate.
(h) KH5 - Parliament summoned by King Henry V of England.
(i) KH4 - Parliament summoned by King Henry IV of England.
(j) Date given for dismissal is the date when writs 'de expensis' were issued.

Parliaments to 1399

See also
Duration of English, British and United Kingdom parliaments from 1660
List of parliaments of England
List of parliaments of Great Britain
List of parliaments of the United Kingdom
List of speakers of the House of Commons of England
List of speakers of the British House of Commons
List of British governments

ReferencesThe House of Lords in the Middle Ages, by J. Enoch Powell and Keith Wallis (Weidenfeld and Nicolson 1968)The Office of Speaker'', by Philip Laundy (Cassell & Company 1964)

 
Parliaments of England
Parliaments of England
Kingdom of England